Maghaz (Urdu:), also known as Bheja, is an offal dish, originating from Hyderabad, India, but is also popular in Pakistani and Bangladeshi cuisine. It is the brain of a cow, goat or sheep served with gravy.

In the Hyderabadi cuisine of India, maghaz masala (bheja fry) is a deep fried goat brain delicacy. Mogoz bhuna is a popular dish in Bangladeshi cuisine, which is cattle or sheep/goat brain sautéed in hot spices. Almonds and pistachios are often added.

References

Brain dishes
Telangana cuisine
Hyderabadi cuisine
Indian cuisine
Pakistani cuisine
Bangladeshi cuisine
Bengali cuisine
Offal
Goat dishes
Beef dishes
Lamb dishes